Marius Anton Joannes Romme (born 17 January 1934, Amsterdam) is a Dutch psychiatrist. He is best known for his work on hearing voices (auditory hallucinations) and regarded as the founder and principal theorist for the Hearing Voices Movement.

Early life, family and education

Romme studied medicine at the University of Amsterdam, where he also received his PhD in 1967.

Career
From 1974 to 1999 he was professor of social psychiatry at the Medical Faculty of the University of Maastricht, as well as consultant psychiatrist at the Community Mental Health Centre in Maastricht, the Netherlands.

He is visiting professor at the Mental Health Policy Centre, Birmingham City University in Birmingham, UK.

Romme is credited with developing Experience Focussed Counselling with Sandra Escher and Joachim Schnackenberg.

Publications
Publications by Marius Romme et al.:
Escher, A.D.M.A.C., Romme, M.A.J., Breuls, M., Driessen, G. (1987). "Maatschappelijk kwetsbaar en langdurig psychiatrisch ziek zijn". Tijdschrift voor Psychiatrie, 29:5,266-281.
Escher, A.D.M.A.C., Romme, M.A.J. (1989). Stemmen horen. Positieve effecten van leren omgaan met stemmen. Tijdschrift voor Ziekenverpleging 24, p. 784-788.
Escher, A.D.M.A.C., Romme, M.A.J. (1991). Het dagboek als communicatiemiddel bij auditieve hallucinaties. Tijdschrift voor Ziekenverpleging (TVZ) 15 augustus 1991 543-547 Escher., A.D.M.A.C. (1993). Stemmen horen: ziekte, gave, topervaring of fase in een groeiproces? Klankspiegel, maart 1993.
Escher, A., Romme, M. (1998) Small talk: voice-hearing in Children. Open Mind July/August.
Escher, A., Romme, M., Buiks, A., Delespaul, Ph., Van Os, J. (2002a). Independent course of childhood auditory hallucinations: a sequential 3-year follow-up study. British Journal of Psychiatry. 181 (suppl. 43), s10-s18.

Escher, A.D.M., Romme, M.A.J., Buiks, A., Delespaul, Ph., Van Os, J. (2002). Kinderen en jeugdigen die stemmen horen: een prospectief driejarig onderzoek. Tijdschrift van de Vereniging voor kinder en jeugdpsychotherapie. Jaargang 29, nr. 4. blz. 4-21.
Escher, A., Romme, M. (2002). Het Maastrichts Interview voor kinderen en Jeugdigen (MIK). Tijdschrift van de Vereniging voor kinder en jeugdpsychotherapie. Jaargang 29, nr. 4. blz. 22-45.

Escher, A. D., Romme, M. A., et al. (2003). Formación de la ideación delirante en adolescentes con alucinaciones auditivas: un estudio prospectivo. Intervención en crisis y tratamiento agudo de los trastornos psiquiátricos graves. P. Pichot, J. Ezcurra, A. González-Pinto and M. Gutiérrz Fraile. Madrid, Aula Médica Ediciones: 185-208.

Pennings, M.H.A., Romme, M.A.J., Buiks, A.A.J.G.M. (1996). Auditieve hallucinaties bij patiënten en niet-patiënten. Tijdschrift voor Psychiatrie.
Noorthoorn, E., Dijkman, C., Escher, A., Romme, M. (1988). Resultaten van de enquête, in Omgaan met stemmen horen. Blz. 199-214. Uitgever; Vakgroep Sociale psychiatrie, Rijksuniversiteit Limburg. Noorthoorn,O., Romme, M.A.J., Escher A.D.M.A.C. (1990). Wat kunnen mensen die stemmen horen de psychiatrie leren?. Sociale Dienstverlening in Nederland. Analyse en evaluatie (Red. E.K. Hicks) p. 60-70.
Romme, M.A.J., Escher, A., Radstake, D., Breuls, M. (1987). Een indeling in groepen van patiënten met een langdurige psychiatrische patiëntencarrière. Tijdschrift voor Psychiatrie, 29,4,197-211.
Romme, M.A.J., Escher, A.D.M.A.C. (1987). Leren omgaan met het horen van stemmen. Maandblad Geestelijk Volksgezondheid 718, p 825-831.
Romme, M.A.J., Escher, A.D.M.A.C. (Eds.) (1988). Research to practice in Community Psychiatry. van Gorkum, Maastricht/Assen.
Romme, M.A.J., Escher, A.D.M.A.C., Habets, V.P.M.J.H. (1988). Omgaan met stemmen horen. (red). Universiteit Maastricht, vakgroep sociale Psychiatrie.
Romme, M.A.J., Escher, A.D.M.A.C. Hearing Voices (1989). Schizophrenia Bulletin 15 (2): 209-216.
Romme, M.A.J., Escher, A.D.M.A.C. (1989). Effects of mutual contacts from people with auditory hallucinations. Perspectief no 3, 37-43, July 1989
Romme, M.A.J., Escher, A.D.M.A.C. (1989). Stimmen hőren inKontakt, Zeitschrift der HPE Österreich nr 116, Oktober 1989.
Romme, M.A.J., Escher, A.D.M.A.C. (1990). Effecten van het onderlinge contact tussen mensen die stemmen horen. Oostland no 2, 8-14.
Romme, M.A.J., Escher, A.D.M.A.C. (1990). Heard but not seen. Open Mind No 49, 16-18.
Romme, M.A.J., Escher, A.D.M.A.C. (1991). Sense in voices. Open Mind 53, The mental health magazine, 9 November.
Romme, M.A.J., Escher, A.D.M.A.C. (1991). Undire le Voci. Spazi della Menten nr. 8, December 1991 p 3-9.

Romme, M.A.J., Escher, A.D.M.A.C. (Eds.). Accepting Voices (1993, second edition 1998), 258 pages, MIND Publications, London. 
Romme, M.A.J., Escher, A.D.M.A.C. (Eds.) (1997). Acceptare le voice [Accepting Voices]. Giuffrè editore. Milano (in Italian)
Romme, M.A.J., Escher, A.D.M.A.C. (Eds.) (1998). Признание голосов  [Accepting Voices]. Kiev, Sfera.  (in Russian)
Romme, M.A.J., Escher, A.D.M.A.C. (Eds.). Understanding voices: coping with auditory hallucinations and confusing realities (1996) First published by Rijksuniversiteit Maastricht, the Netherlands and also English edition, Handsell Publications.
Romme, M.A.J., Escher, A.D.M.A.C. (1997). Stimmen hőren akzeptieren. Psychiatrie-Verlag. Bonn.
Romme, M.A.J., Escher, A.D.M.A.C. (1997). Na compananhia das voces. Editorial Estampa, Lda., Lisboa Portugal.
Romme, M.A.J., Escher, A.D.M.A.C. (1997). Moniääniset. Printway Oy, Vantaa.Finland.
Romme, M.A.J., Escher, A.D.M.A.C. (1999). Omgaan met stemmen horen. Stichting Positieve Gezondheidszorg. Bemelen.
Romme, M.A.J., Escher, A.D.M.A.C. (1999). Stemmen horen accepteren. Tirion, Baarn.
Romme, M.A.J., Escher, A.D.M.A.C. (1999). Stimmenhören Akzeptieren, Neunplus 1 Berlin. Duitsland.
Romme, Marius and Escher, Sandra: Making Sense of Voices – A guide for professionals who work with voice hearers: (2000) MIND Publications
Romme, M.A.J., Escher, A.D.M.A.C. (2003). Förstå och hantera roster. RSNH. Riksförbundet för Social och Mental Hälsa.Stockholm. Sweden
Romme, M.A.J., Escher, A.D.M.A.C. (2003). Giv stemmerne mening. Systime Academic. Århus, Denmark.
Romme, M.A.J., Escher, A.D.M.A.C. (2005). Managing Distressing Voice Hearing Experiences In Wellness Recovery Action Plan. Mary Ellen Copeland edited by Piers Allott. P. Sefton Recovery Group, Liverpool, UK. P. 114-118.
Romme, M.A.J., Escher, A.D.M.A.C. (2006). Nachwort. In Hannelore Klafki, Meine Stimmen – Quälgeister und Schutzengel. Texte einer engagierten Stimmenhörerin (pp. 175–178). Berlin / Eugene / Shrewsbury: Antipsychiatrieverlag. . (E-Book 2016).
Romme, M.A.J., Escher, A.D.M.A.C. (2007). Intervoice: Stimmenhören akzeptieren und verstehen. In Peter Lehmann & Peter Stastny (Eds.), Statt Psychiatrie 2 (pp. 134–140). Berlin / Eugene / Shrewsbury: Antipsychiatrieverlag. . (E-Book 2018).
Romme, M.A.J., Escher, A.D.M.A.C. (2007). Intervoice: Accepting and making sense of hearing voices. In Peter Stastny & Peter Lehmann (Eds.), Alternatives Beyond Psychiatry (pp. 131–137). Berlin / Eugene / Shrewsbury: Peter Lehmann Publishing.  (UK),  (USA). (E-Book 2018).
Romme, Marius,  Morris, Mervyn. The harmful concept of Schizophrenia, Mental Health Nursing, 7–11 March 2007.
Romme, M.A.J., Escher, A.D.M.A.C. (Eds.) (2013). Psychosis as a Personal Crisis: An Experience-Based Approach. Routledge.

See also
 Hearing Voices Network
 Hearing Voices Movement
 Interpretation of Schizophrenia
 Ross Institute for Psychological Trauma
 Trauma model of mental disorders
 Experience Focussed Counselling

References

External links
 Hearing Voices (archived)
 Intervoice: International Network for Training, Education and Research into Hearing Voices

Schizophrenia researchers
1934 births
Living people
Dutch psychiatrists
Physicians from Amsterdam
Academic staff of Maastricht University